Stambach may refer to:

Stambach, Austria
Stambach, part of Contwig
Scott Stambach

See also
 Stammbach
 Stammbuch (disambiguation)